Rock Scorpions (known as Sovereign Scorpions for sponsorship reasons) is a Gibraltarian rugby team. It operates as a franchise rather than a traditional club, like all teams in the Gibraltarian domestic structure. As the name implies, the team is named for the Rock of Gibraltar.

External links
Rock Scorpions at Gibraltar RFU

Rugby union in Gibraltar